GEMM may refer to:

General matrix multiply gemm, one of the Basic Linear Algebra Subprograms
Genetically engineered mouse model
Gilt-edged market maker
Global Electronic Music Marketplace, a former online music market
CFU-GEMM, granulocyte-erythrocyte-monocyte-megakaryocyte colony forming unit

See also
Gem (disambiguation)